Liugongli station is a station on Line 3 of Chongqing Rail Transit in Chongqing Municipality, China. It is located in Nan'an District. It opened in 2011.

Station structure

References

Railway stations in Chongqing
Railway stations in China opened in 2011
Chongqing Rail Transit stations